Tineretului means  in Romanian.

Tineretului may also refer to:
 Tineretului - a neighborhood in Bucharest
 Tineretului statue - a monument
 Tineretului Park - a recreational space in Bucharest
 Tineretului metro station - in Bucharest

Stadiums
 Stadionul Tineretului (Urziceni)
 Stadionul Silviu Ploieşteanu (previously known as Stadionul Tineretului)
 Stadionul Arcul de Triumf (also known as Stadionul Tineretului)